This is a list of parks in Midland, Michigan

References

Protected areas of Midland County, Michigan
Midland, Michigan
Parks in Michigan
Midland County, Michigan parks